Edgar Müller (born 1968, Mülheim, Ruhr, Germany, often transliterated Mueller) is a  3D  street artist,

See also
Kurt Wenner
Leon Keer

Sources

Further reading
Menkhoff, Inga (2007). Optical Illusions: Amazing Deceptive Images, Where Seeing Is Believing, p. 13 and 30. .
Inc. Scholastic (2011). Ripley's Believe It or Not!: Ripley's Curioddities, p. 116. .

External links
"Edgar Müller", Metanamorph.com.
(Fri May 13, 11:20 AM ET). "3D Street Art by Edgar Mueller", Yahoo! News.
Madlangbayan, Alex (May 17, 2011). "Edgar Mueller Art On Moscow 3D Sidewalk Paintings (Photo{s})", BatangasToday.com.

Pavement artists
Living people
1968 births
People from Mülheim
20th-century German painters
20th-century German male artists
German male painters
21st-century German painters
21st-century German male artists